Ivanka Ninova is a Bulgarian mezzo-soprano opera singer born in Vidin.

Education
She began her musical education at a music school and later at the Pancho Vladigerov National Academy of Music in Sofia.

Career
Since 1989 she has been a soloist at the Sofia National Opera.
Her roles include Princess Eboli in Don Carlo, Preziosilla in La Forza del Destino, Amneris in Aida, Azucena in Il Trovatore, Fenena in Nabucco, Suzuki in Madame Butterfly, and Carmen. Ninova has given many concert hall performances, including roles in the requiems of Mozart, Verdi, and Dvorak, in Rossini's Stabat Mater, Handel's Messiah, Beethoven's 9th Symphony and many others. More recently she has been a lecturer at the Pancho Vladigerov Music Academy. Though she has performed abroad and throughout Europe, her career has been largely limited to Bulgaria.

References 
 Ivanka Ninova's Art official page

20th-century Bulgarian women opera singers
21st-century Bulgarian women opera singers
People from Vidin
Living people
Year of birth missing (living people)